The Super-Sons are a pair of fictional characters appearing in American comic books published by DC Comics. The characters were created by Bob Haney and Dick Dillin and first appeared in World's Finest Comics #215 (January 1973). The characters were featured in stories about the sons of Superman and Batman.

In 2017, DC Comics launched a Super Sons monthly comic book series featuring new versions of the characters, going by the names Superboy (Jonathan Kent, the son of Superman and Lois Lane), and Robin (Damian Wayne, the son of Batman and Talia al Ghul).

Publication history
The Super-Sons first appeared together in World's Finest Comics #154 (December 1965). Batman's imaginary son was seen first in Batman #131 (April 1960), Batman #145 (February 1962) and Batman #163 (May 1964). The Super-Sons, Superman Jr. (Clark Kent Jr.) and Batman Jr. (Bruce Wayne Jr.), were college-aged versions of their superhero fathers. Their mothers are never referred to by name, nor are their faces ever shown, though Superman's wife is dark-haired and Batman's wife is a redhead. The Super-Sons look almost exactly like their fathers and wear identical costumes. The characters spoke with a slightly exaggerated version of the slang popular in the late 1960s and early 1970s. They regard each other as brothers since both understand the pressures involved in being the son of a living legend. Like his father, Batman Jr. has no superhuman powers and relies on athletic prowess and gadgets. Superman Jr., who is only half-Kryptonian, has powers levels of only half that of Superman, Sr.

Although the very first Super-Sons appearance stated that these were actual stories in the lives of Superman and Batman, the final story in World's Finest #263, "Final Secret of the Super-Sons", written by Dennis O'Neil, revealed that the Sons had never really existed — they were merely computer simulations of what might have been, created by Superman and Batman on the Man of Steel's computer in his Fortress of Solitude.

They later inspired the characters Joel Kent and Bruce Wayne Jr. in the three Superman & Batman: Generations comic book series.

It was thought that the events of the Crisis on Infinite Earths limited series had erased Superman Jr. and Batman Jr. from DC continuity, but this assumption was later shown to be incorrect.

A Super-Sons story by Bob Haney was published in the comic special Elseworlds 80-Page Giant (1999). In "Elseworlds" tales, "heroes are taken from their usual settings and put into strange times and places – some that have existed, and others that can't, couldn't or shouldn't exist". Eventually, the Super-Sons reality would be named Earth-216 and designated a Hypertime reality unaffected by the Crisis.

The Earth-154 variant of the Super-Sons (and their fathers) appear briefly during the Infinite Crisis limited series, during which time Alexander Luthor, Jr. of Earth-Three warps reality in an attempt to restore the DC Multiverse. Their planet and countless other Earths later contract into a single "New Earth". In the limited series 52, it is revealed that 52 identical parallel universes were created. During his subsequent attempt to consume the multiverse, the evil Venusian worm Mister Mind altered each of the parallel worlds, creating distinct histories for each. According to DC Nation #89, one of those worlds is Earth-16, home of the Super-Sons.

In September 2011, The New 52 rebooted DC's continuity. In this new timeline, the Super-Sons (Chris Kent as Superman and Damian Wayne as Batman) reside on Earth-16 as members of the Just—the sons and daughters of the classic JLA who have inherited a crimeless, utopian universe and so live as idle celebrities.

The Super-Sons stories
The titles of the individual 'Parts' of the stories are presented here as they were written in the comic books; in other words, that of Part Two of Little Town With A Big Secret was actually shown in quotation marks and the number of The Angel With A Dirty Name Part 3 was in numerical form rather than being spelled out, as were the previous two parts. These variations have thus been reflected below and are not mistakes.

Unlike the other stories, Saga of the Super Sons and Final Secret of the Super Sons were not divided into parts.

It should also be pointed out that 'Super Sons' was spelled both on the story titles and on the cover of DC Comics' trade-paperback collection without a hyphen, as here.

In World's Finest Comics, the title of the series as given on the stories themselves tended to vary from issue to issue, i.e., Superman and Batman, Superman, Batman and their Super-Sons etc. These variations have been mentioned where they occur.  Cry Not For My Forsaken Son bore only its story title and no series title was given to it at all.

Collected edition
In December 2007, DC Comics published a trade paperback collection of the series entitled Superman/Batman: Saga of the Super Sons. It collects the stories from: World's Finest Comics #215–216, 221–222, 224, 228, 230, 231, 233, 238, 242, and 263 and Elseworlds 80-Page Giant #1. The story in World's Finest Comics #263 is written by Dennis O'Neil, all the others by Bob Haney.

Super Sons (2017)

DC Comics presented a new version of the Super Sons in 2017. The two central characters are Damian Wayne, son of Bruce Wayne and Talia al Ghul, and Jonathan Kent, son of Clark Kent and Lois Lane. The former is 13 years of age in this version (as of the 80-page DC Rebirth Holiday Special #1), while the latter is 10 years old. The advance releases describe them as "best frenemies forever" who will save the world together "if they don't kill each other first". The series was launched in February 2017 and ended in May 2018 with 16 issues and one Annual.

An alternate version of the Super Sons named the Bizarro Boyz appeared in the four-part story "Boyzarro Re-Death". Robzarro was a member of the Bizarro Boyz, along with Boyzarro. Both the team name and character names were influenced by fans on social media.

Adventures of the Super Sons, a 12-issue miniseries serves as a continuation of the Super Sons series, with Peter J. Tomasi as the writer and art by Carlo Barberi and Art Thibert. The first issue was released in August 2018. The final issue was released in July 2019.

DC Comics released a digital-first series, Challenge of the Super Sons, from December 2020 to April 2021.

Collected editions

Graphic novel
The Super Sons, Jon Kent and Damian "Ian" Wayne, are featured in a three-part graphic novel series by author Ridley Pearson and artist Ile Gonzalez. The first book, Super Sons: The Polarshield Project was released in April 2019. Book two, Super Sons: The Foxglove Mission was released in November 2019. The third book Super Sons: Escape to Landis was released in October 2020.

In other media
 A reimagining of the "Super Sons" appears in the television series Superman & Lois, in which Lois and Clark's teenage sons, Jonathan Kent and Jordan Kent, are played by Jordan Elsass and Alexander Garfin.

Batman and Superman: Battle of the Super Sons (2022), a CG-animated film starring Jack Dylan Grazer as Jonathan Kent and Jack Griffo as Damian Wayne, who join forces to save the planet by becoming the Super Sons that they were destined to be. Part of the DC Universe Animated Original Movies, it was released by Warner Bros. Animation on October 18, 2022.

References

External links
Operation Super-Sons
Batman Junior's entry on Obscure Characters in the DC Universe
Detective Comics #231 on GCD
Detective Comics #231 Synopsis on DC Indexes

Super-Sons entry at DC Comics Database, a Wikia database on DC characters.

Characters created by Dick Dillin
Characters created by Bob Haney
Comics characters introduced in 1973
Batman characters
Superman characters
DC Comics superhero teams
Elseworlds titles
Fictional duos
Teenage superheroes
Team-up comics
Comics by Peter J. Tomasi
Comics adapted into animated films